Meadowood may refer to:

Meadowood, Pennsylvania
Meadowood Mall
Meadowood, Aurora, Colorado
Meadowood Estates, California
The Restaurant at Meadowood, a Michelin Guide 3-star restaurant located in Napa Valley, California